A list of horror films released in 2015.

References

2015
2015-related lists